Ivan Krasnetskyi (27 December 1945 – 23 April 2010) was a Soviet and Ukrainian football player and coach. He is the Distinguished professional of physical culture and sport of Ukraine.

Coaching Record

External links
  Newspaper Match (Ivano-Frankivsk) May 11, 2012
 

1945 births
2010 deaths
Soviet footballers
Ukrainian footballers
FC Frunzenets-Liha-99 Sumy players
FC Spartak Ivano-Frankivsk players
SKA Lviv players
Soviet football managers
Ukrainian football managers
FC Hoverla Uzhhorod managers
FC Spartak Ivano-Frankivsk managers
NK Veres Rivne managers
MFC Mykolaiv managers
FC Krystal Chortkiv managers
FC Kalush managers
FC Beskyd Nadvirna managers
FC Chornohora Ivano-Frankivsk managers
Ukrainian Premier League managers
Association football goalkeepers
Sportspeople from Ivano-Frankivsk Oblast